The Brewster F2A Buffalo is an American fighter aircraft which saw service early in World War II. Designed and built by the Brewster Aeronautical Corporation, it was one of the first U.S. monoplanes with an arrestor hook and other modifications for aircraft carriers. The Buffalo won a competition against the Grumman F4F Wildcat in 1939 to become the U.S. Navy's first monoplane fighter aircraft. Although superior to the Grumman F3F biplane it replaced, and the early F4Fs, the Buffalo was largely obsolete when the United States entered the war, being unstable and overweight, especially when compared to the Japanese Mitsubishi A6M Zero.

Several nations, including Finland, Belgium, Britain and the Netherlands, ordered the Buffalo. The Finns were the most successful with their Buffalos, flying them in combat against early Soviet fighters with excellent results. During the Continuation War of 1941–1944, the B-239s (de-navalized F2A-1s) operated by the Finnish Air Force proved capable of engaging and destroying most types of Soviet fighter aircraft operating against Finland at that time, and claimed in the first phase of that conflict 32 Soviet aircraft shot down for every B-239 lost,  producing 36 Buffalo "aces".

In December 1941, Buffalos operated by both British Commonwealth (B-339E) and Dutch (B-339C/D) air forces in South East Asia suffered severe losses in combat against the Japanese Navy's A6M Zero and the Japanese Army's Nakajima Ki-43 "Oscar". The British attempted to lighten their Buffalos by removing ammunition and fuel and installing lighter guns to improve performance, but it made little difference. After the first few engagements, the Dutch halved the fuel and ammunition load in the wings, which allowed their Buffalos (and their Hurricanes) to stay with the Oscars in turns.

The Buffalo was built in three variants for the U.S. Navy: the F2A-1, F2A-2 and F2A-3. (In foreign service, with lower horsepower engines, these types were designated B-239, B-339, and B-339-23 respectively.) The F2A-3 variant saw action with United States Marine Corps (USMC) squadrons at the Battle of Midway. Shown by the experience of Midway to be no match for the Zero, the F2A-3 was derided by USMC pilots as a "flying coffin". Indeed, the F2A-3s performance was substantially inferior to the F2A-2 variant used by the Navy before the outbreak of the war despite detail improvements.

Design and development

United States Navy
In 1935, the U.S. Navy issued a requirement for a carrier-based fighter intended to replace the Grumman F3F biplane. The Brewster XF2A-1 monoplane, designed by a team led by Dayton T. Brown, was one of two aircraft designs that were initially considered. The XF4F-1 with a double-row radial engine was a "classic" biplane. The XF2A-1 first flew on 2 December 1937 and early test results showed it was far in advance of the Grumman biplane entry. While the XF4F-1 did not enter production, it later re-emerged as a monoplane, the Wildcat.

The Buffalo was manufactured at the Brewster Building in Long Island City, New York.

The new Brewster fighter had a modern look with a stubby fuselage, mid-set monoplane wings and a host of advanced features. It was all-metal, with flush-riveted, stressed aluminum construction, although control surfaces were still fabric-covered. The XF2A-1 also featured split flaps, a hydraulically operated retractable main undercarriage (and partially retractable tailwheel), and a streamlined framed canopy. However (as was still common at this time), the aircraft lacked self-sealing fuel tanks and pilot armor. Fuel capacity was only , stored in the fuselage. The aircraft was then tested in 1938 in the Langley Research Center full-scale wind tunnel, where it was determined that certain factors were contributing to parasitic drag. Other manufacturers took notice of this 10% increase in speed and efficiency, and wind tunnel tests became standard procedure in the US. With only a single-stage supercharger, high-altitude performance fell off rapidly. Fuselage armament was one fixed  M2 Browning machine gun with 200 rounds and one fixed  AN Browning machine gun with 600 rounds, both in the nose. The Navy awarded Brewster Aeronautical Corporation a production contract for 54 aircraft, the F2A-1s.

Service testing of the XF2A-1 prototype began in January 1938 and in June, production started on the F2A-1. They were powered by  Wright R-1820-34 engines and had larger fins. Plagued by production difficulties, Brewster delivered only 11 F2A-1 aircraft to the Navy; the remainder of the order was later diverted to the Finnish Air Force in modified form under the export designation Model 239.

A later variant, the F2A-2, of which 43 were ordered by the U.S. Navy, included a more powerful R-1820-40 engine, a better propeller, and integral flotation gear, while still lacking pilot armor and self-sealing tanks. Both the F2A-1 and the F2A-2 variants of the Brewster were liked by early Navy and Marine pilots, including Pappy Boyington, who praised the good turning and maneuvering abilities of the aircraft. Boyington is alleged to have opined "...the early models, before they weighed it all down with armor plate, radios, and other [equipment], they were pretty sweet little ships. Not real fast, but the little [aircraft] could turn and roll in a phone booth" as he stated in his autobiography Baa Baa Black Sheep. This might be expected from the low wing loading, in earlier versions comparable with the Mitsubishi A6M Zero's 22 pounds per square foot.

The F2A-3 was the last version of the Buffalo to enter service with the U.S. Navy and Marine Corps. A total of 108 examples were ordered in January 1941. By this time, the Navy had become disenchanted with the Buffalo, and had become especially annoyed at Brewster Aeronautical Corporation's frequent production delays and its frequent management difficulties. This order was seen more as a way of keeping Brewster's production lines running; they would eventually build Corsair fighters for the Navy as well as Buccaneer/Bermuda dive bombers.

The addition of armor plating for the pilot and increased ammunition capacity further increased the aircraft's weight, resulting in a reduced top speed and rate of climb, while substantially degrading the Brewster's turning and maneuvering capability. The Navy found that the added weight of the F2A-3 also aggravated the problem of landing gear failure during carrier landings. However, the −40 two-speed supercharged Cyclone engine in the F2A-3 was an excellent "cruising" engine, and as such the F2A-3 had some value and saw initial service on the carriers Saratoga and Lexington.

Even in late 1940 it was apparent that the Buffalo was rapidly becoming obsolete. It badly needed a more powerful engine, but the limits of the airframe had been reached, making installation of a larger engine impossible.  Soon after deliveries of the F2A-3 began, the Navy decided to eliminate the type altogether. By then, considered a second line aircraft, some were transferred to the U.S. Marine Corps, which deployed two F2A-3 squadrons to the Pacific, one at Palmyra Atoll, and another at Midway Island. Those which still remained on board aircraft carriers narrowly missed a combat opportunity when a relief mission was dispatched to Wake Island, but the relief force was withdrawn before completing the mission. Shortly thereafter, F2A-3s still in naval service were transferred to training squadrons for use as advanced trainers.

Operational history
The first unit to be equipped with the F2A-1 was Lt. Cdr. Warren Harvey's VF-3, assigned to  air group. On 8 December 1939, VF-3 received 10 of the 11 Buffalos delivered to the U.S. Navy. The remaining 43 F2A-1s were declared surplus and sold to Finland. Ralph Ingersoll wrote in late 1940 after visiting Britain that the Buffalo and other American aircraft "cannot compete with either the existing English or German fighters", so Britain used them "either as advanced trainers --or for fighting equally obsolete Italian planes in the Middle East. That is all they are good for". Even the Eagle Squadrons's American pilots used Hawker Hurricanes instead of the Buffalo. Early in the war all modern monoplane fighter types were in high demand, however. Consequently, the United Kingdom, Belgium, and the Netherlands East Indies purchased several hundred export models.

Finland

In April 1939, the Finnish government contacted the Roosevelt administration, requesting the supply of modern combat aircraft as quickly as possible. On 17 October, the Finnish Embassy in Washington, D.C., received a telegram clearing the purchase of fighter aircraft. The only strict requirements laid down by Finnish authorities were that the aircraft be already operational and able to use 87-octane fuel. Part of an F2A-1 shipment – 44 aircraft originally intended for the US Navy – was diverted to Finland, by the US State Department, after the USN agreed to instead accept a later shipment of F2A-2 variants.

On 16 December, the Finnish government signed a contract to purchase 44 aircraft: a F2A-1 variant designated Model B-239E by Brewster. Unlike other fighters already in service, the F2A-1 and B-239E lacked self-sealing fuel tanks and cockpit armor. However, the B-239E was built with a more powerful engine than the F2A-1, in the form of the Wright R-1820-G5, producing , and the capacity to carry four machine guns (rather than the two carried by the F2A-1). The B-239E was also  "de-navalized" before shipment: equipment such as tailhooks and life raft containers were removed. The upgraded engine and slightly reduced net weight (i.e. from the omitted armor and de-navalization) resulted in an improved power-to-weight ratio and better general performance.

In four batches the B-239E was shipped initially to Bergen, in Norway, in January and February 1940 from New York City. The crated fighters were then sent by railway to Sweden and assembled by SAAB at Trollhättan, northeast of Gothenburg.

After delivery of the B-239E, the Finnish Air Force added armored backrests, metric flight instruments, the Väisälä T.h.m.40 gunsight, and four  machine guns.

In February 1940, pilot Lieutenant Jorma "Joppe" Karhunen flight-tested the first B-239 to become operational in Finland. Unfamiliar with the aircraft, he burned out the engine while flying very low at high speed; crashing on a snow-covered field, damaging the propeller and some belly panels. Initially unimpressed, the Finns later witnessed a demonstration by a Brewster test pilot, who was able to stay on the tail of a Finnish Fiat G.50 Freccia  fighter from Italy; although the Fiat fighter was faster in level flight, the Brewster could out-turn it.

None of the B-239E fighters saw combat in the Winter War (1939–1940). However, five of the six delivered during the war became combat-ready before it ended.

The B-239E was never referred to as the name Buffalo in Finland; it was known simply as the Brewster, or by the nicknames Taivaan helmi ("sky pearl") or Pohjoisten taivaiden helmi ("pearl of the northern skies"). Other nicknames were Pylly-Valtteri (lit. "butt-walter"), Amerikanrauta ("American hardware" or "American car") and Lentävä kaljapullo ("flying beer-bottle"). The total of 44 examples of the B-239E fighters used by the FAF received serial numbers BW-351 to BW-394.

Finnish pilots regarded the B-239E  as being easy to fly, or in the words of ace Ilmari Juutilainen, a "gentlemen's travelling [or touring] plane".  The Buffalo was also popular within the FAF because of its relatively long range and good maintenance record. This was in part due to the efforts of the Finnish mechanics, who solved a problem that plagued the Wright Cyclone engine by inverting one of the piston rings in each cylinder, which had a positive effect on reliability. The cooler weather of Finland also helped, because the engine was prone to overheating as noted in tropical Pacific use. The Brewster Buffalo earned a reputation in Finnish Air Force service as one of its more successful fighter aircraft, along with the Fiat G.50, which scored an unprecedented kill-loss ratio of 33-1.

In service from 1941 to 1945, Buffalos of Lentolaivue 24 (Fighter Squadron 24) claimed 477 Soviet Air Force warplanes destroyed, with the combat loss of just 19 Buffalos, an outstanding victory ratio of 26:1.

During the Continuation War, Lentolaivue 24 (Fighter Squadron 24) was equipped with the B-239s until May 1944, when the Buffalos were transferred to Hävittäjälentolaivue 26 (Fighter Squadron 26). Most of the pilots of Lentolaivue 24 were Winter War combat veterans. This squadron claimed a total of 459 Soviet aircraft with B-239s, while losing 15 Buffalos in combat.

The Brewsters had their baptism by fire in Finland on 25 June 1941, when a pair of Buffalos from 2/LLv24, operating from Selänpää airfield (ICAO:EFSE) intercepted 27 Soviet Tupolev SBs from 201st SBAP  near Heinola. Five SBs were claimed as downed. Subsequent attacks were repelled by LLv24 pilots who, by dusk, had flown 77 sorties.

Many Finnish pilots racked up enormous scores by using basic tactics against Soviet aircraft. The default tactic was the four-plane "parvi" (swarm), with a pair flying lower as bait, and a higher pair to dive on enemy interceptors. The Soviet Air Force was never able to counter this tactic.  The top-scoring B-239 pilot was Hans Wind, with 39 kills. Lt Hans Wind, with six other Buffalos of LeLv 24, intercepted some 60 Soviet aircraft near Kronstad. Two Soviet Pe-2 bombers, one Soviet Hawker Hurricane fighter, and 12 I-16s were claimed for the loss of just one B-239 (BW-378).  After evaluation of claims against actual Soviet losses, aircraft BW-364 was found to have been used to achieve 42½ kills in total by all pilots operating it, possibly making it the highest-scoring fighter airframe in the history of air warfare. The top scoring Finnish ace, Ilmari Juutilainen, scored 34 of his 94½ kills in B-239s, including 28 in BW-364.

During the Continuation War, a lack of replacements led the Finns to develop a copy of the Buffalo built from non-strategic materials such as plywood, however the Humu, as they called it, was already obsolete and only a single prototype was built. By late 1943, the lack of spares, wear-and-tear, and better Soviet fighters and training greatly reduced the effectiveness of Finnish B-239s, though LeLv 26 pilots would still claim some 35 victories against Soviet aircraft in mid-1944. The last victory by a Buffalo against Soviet aircraft was claimed over the Karelian Isthmus on 17 June 1944.

From 1943, Finland's air force received Messerschmitt Bf 109Gs from Germany, and this much-superior fighter re-equipped most Finnish Air Force fighter squadrons.

After Finland signed an armistice with the Soviet Union in September, 1944, they had to drive Finland's former ally, Nazi Germany out of the country during the "Lapland War". The only clash with the Luftwaffe took place on 3 October 1944 when HLeLV 26 intercepted Junkers Ju 87s, claiming two, the last victories to be made by Brewster pilots in World War II. By the end of the war in Lapland, only eight B-239s were left.

Five B-239s continued to fly until 1948, with last flights of Brewsters by the Finnish Air Force on 14 September 1948, when they were stored until scrapped in 1953.

Belgium
Just before the start of the war, Belgium sought more modern aircraft to expand and modernize its air force. Belgium ordered 40 Brewster B-339 aircraft, a de-navalized F2A-2, fitted with the Wright R-1820-G-105 engine approved for export use. The arrestor hook and liferaft container were removed, and the aircraft was modified with a slightly longer tail.

Only one aircraft reached France by the time Germany launched its Blitzkrieg in the West on 10 May 1940. The Buffalo was later captured intact by the Germans, and it was partially rediscovered near Darmstadt in 1945.

Six more Belgian Brewsters were offloaded at the French Caribbean island of Martinique and languished on a coastal hillside, never to be flown. The rest of the order went to the RAF.

British Commonwealth (Malaya)

Facing a shortage of combat aircraft in January 1940, the British government established the British Purchasing Commission to acquire U.S. aircraft that would help supplement domestic production. Among the U.S. fighter aircraft that caught the Commission's attention was the Brewster. The remaining 32 B-339 aircraft ordered by the Belgians, suspended at the fall of France, were passed on to the United Kingdom. Appraisal by Royal Air Force acceptance personnel criticized it on numerous points including inadequate armament and lack of pilot armor, poor high-altitude performance, engine overheating, maintenance issues, and cockpit controls, while it was praised for its handling, roomy cockpit, and visibility. Still desperately in need of fighter aircraft in the Pacific and Asia for British and Commonwealth air forces, the UK ordered an additional 170 aircraft under the type specification B-339E. The aircraft were sent to Royal Australian Air Force, RAF and Royal New Zealand Air Force fighter squadrons in Singapore, Malaya and Burma, shortly before the outbreak of war with Japan.

The Brewster aircraft delivered to British and Commonwealth air forces were significantly altered from the B-339 type sold to the Belgium and French forces in accordance with their purchase order. The Brewster factory removed the Navy life raft container and arrestor hook, while adding many new items of equipment, including a British Mk III reflector gun sight, a gun camera, a larger fixed pneumatic tire tail wheel, fire extinguisher, engine shutters, a larger battery, and reinforced armor plating and armored glass behind the canopy windshield.

The Brewster Model B-339E, as modified and supplied to Great Britain was distinctly inferior in performance to the F2A-2 (Model B-339) from the original order. The semi-retractable tail wheel had been exchanged for a larger fixed model, which was also less aerodynamic.

The Wright Cyclone 1890-G-105 engine designated for use in the Brewster Mk I was in short supply; many aircraft were fitted with secondhand Wright engines sourced from Douglas DC-3 airliners and rebuilt to G105 or G102A specifications by Wright. The fuselage tanks were filled with a minimum of fuel, and run on high-octane aviation petrol where available.

Many of the pilots assigned the Buffalo lacked adequate training and experience in the type. A total of 20 of the original 169 Buffalos were lost in training accidents during 1941. By December 1941, approximately 150 Buffalo B-339E aircraft made up the bulk of the British fighter defenses of Burma, Malaya and Singapore. The two RAAF, two RAF, and one RNZAF squadrons, during December 1941 – January 1942, were beset with numerous problems, including poorly built and ill-equipped aircraft. Aviation historian Dan Ford characterized it as, "The performance... was pathetic." Inadequate spare parts and support staff, airfields that were difficult to defend against air attack, lack of a clear and coherent command structure, a Japanese spy in the Army air liaison staff, antagonism between RAF and RAAF squadrons and personnel, and inexperienced pilots lacking appropriate training would lead to disaster. Although the Mk I had .50-inch guns, many aircraft were equipped with .303 Browning mounts and electric firing solenoids, which tended to fail in service.

When the Japanese invaded northern Malaya on 8 December 1941, the B-339E initially performed adequately. Against the Nakajima Ki-27 "Nate", the overloaded Brewsters could at least hold their own if given time to get to altitude, and at first achieved a respectable number of kills. However, the appearance of ever greater numbers of Japanese fighters, including markedly superior types such as the Nakajima Ki-43 "Oscar" soon overwhelmed the Buffalo pilots, both in the air and on the ground. Another significant factor was the Brewster engine's tendency to overheat in the tropical climate, which caused oil to spray over the windscreen, usually forcing an aborted mission and greatly complicating attempts to intercept and destroy enemy aircraft. In the end, more than 60 Brewster Mk I (B-339E) aircraft were shot down in combat, 40 destroyed on the ground, and approximately 20 more destroyed in accidents. Only about 20 Buffalos survived to reach India or the Dutch East Indies. The last airworthy Buffalo in Singapore flew out on 10 February, five days before the island fell.

It is not entirely clear how many Japanese aircraft the Buffalo squadrons shot down, although RAAF pilots alone managed to shoot down at least 20. Eighty were claimed in total, a ratio of kills to losses of just 1.3 to 1. Additionally, most of the Japanese aircraft shot down by the Buffalos were bombers. The Hawker Hurricane, which fought in Singapore alongside the Buffalo from 20 January, also suffered severe losses from ground attack; most were destroyed. The Fleet Air Arm also used the Buffalo in the Mediterranean in the Battle of Crete in early 1941.

The Brewster Mark I produced four Commonwealth aces: Geoff Fisken, Maurice Holder, A. W. B. (Alf) Clare and R. D. (Doug) Vanderfield. New Zealander Fisken, the top-scoring pilot, later flew RNZAF P-40s and became the highest-scoring Commonwealth pilot within the Pacific theatre.

Burma
No. 67 Squadron RAF was equipped with thirty Buffalos when the Japanese invaded Burma. They were joined by Curtiss P-40 fighters of the American Volunteer Group (Flying Tigers). AVG crews were initially impressed with the Buffalo, some even urging General Claire Chennault to trade a squadron of P-40s for Buffalos. In response, Chennault arranged a mock dogfight between both fighters, with 1st Lieutenant Erik Shilling flying the P-40 and Squadron Leader Jack Brandt flying the Buffalo. Over their training base in Toungoo, the P-40 proved to be superior to the Buffalo. When Shilling and Brandt met again fifty years later, the RAF pilot said, "how I wish I could have swapped my aircraft for yours".

The Buffalos and P-40s carried out air defenses over Rangoon and Mingaladon as well as strafing missions on Japanese airfields. Like Malaya and Singapore, lack of effective early warning systems greatly hampered British and AVG efforts to defend Burma from air raids. Reports of Japanese aircraft performance from the Malayan Campaign prompted Buffalo pilots in Burma to employ different tactics; according to Flight Sergeant Vic Bargh, "come in from above, or at the same level at the very least, then dive away before they got onto you, because if they did get onto you, well, you were shot down". One of the Buffalo's final victories of the Burma Campaign was claimed by Bargh; he found the wreckage of the bomber and had his picture taken with it as proof.

The IJAAF secured air superiority over Rangoon by early February 1942, and with the situation on the ground rapidly deteriorating, No. 67 Squadron withdrew north to Toungoo. On 13 February, the squadron moved further north to Magwe with only eight Buffalos, where they continued to carry out reconnaissance flights as well as escorting Westland Lysanders on ground attack missions. The Buffalo flew its last combat sortie with the RAF on 5 March, escorting Hawker Hurricanes and Bristol Blenheims for an attack on a Japanese airbase in Chiang Mai, Thailand. Only six Buffalos remained when the squadron withdrew to Calcutta, India on 11 March to re-equip with Hurricanes. They were swiftly relegated to training duties, though two were briefly acquired by No. 146 Squadron RAF in early April, one of which was regularly flown by Squadron Leader Count Manfred Czernin. No. 67 Squadron claimed 27 Japanese aircraft destroyed; eight Buffalos were shot down and eight pilots were killed. For their actions, Squadron Leader Jack Brandt and Flight Lieutenant Colin Pinckney were awarded the Distinguished Flying Cross (the latter posthumously), while Sergeant Gordon Williams received the Distinguished Flying Medal.

Netherlands East Indies

The Militaire Luchtvaart van het Koninklijk Nederlands-Indisch Leger ("Military Air Service of the Royal Netherlands East Indian Army", ML-KNIL) had ordered 144 Brewster B-339C and 339D models, the former with rebuilt Wright G-105 engines supplied by the Dutch and the latter with new  Wright R-1820-40 engines Brewster purchased from Wright. At the outbreak of war, only 71 had arrived in the Dutch East Indies, and not all were in service. A small number served briefly at Singapore before being withdrawn for the defense of Borneo and Java.

As the Brewster B-339 aircraft used by the ML-KNIL were lighter than the modified B-339E Brewster Mark Is used by British, Australian, and New Zealand air forces, they were able to successfully engage the Japanese Army Nakajima Ki-43 "Oscar", although both the "Oscar" and the Japanese Navy's A6M Zero still out-climbed the B-339 at combat altitudes (the Zero was faster as well). After the first few engagements, the Dutch halved the fuel and ammo load in the wing, which allowed their Buffalos (and their Hurricanes) to stay with the Oscars in turns. In February 1942 they received new model gunsights. Around the same time the Dutch started to use tracer ammunition as well. These two improved their hit ratio. Still, their lack of heavy machine guns (.50") meant their success rate wasn't as high as it could have been.

Apart from their role as fighters, the Brewster fighters were also used as dive bombers against Japanese troopships. Although reinforced by British Commonwealth Buffalo Mk I (B-339E) aircraft retreating from Malaya, the Dutch squadrons faced superior numbers in the air, usually odds of one against two or three. Timely early warning from British radar would have countered this deficit, especially in avoiding unnecessary losses from raids on airfields, but the British government had decided too late to send these: the first British radar stations became operational only towards the end of February. Had they been ready two weeks earlier, the outcome of the Japanese invasion here might well have been different (read Boer's book).

In a major engagement above Semplak on 19 February 1942, eight Dutch Brewster fighters intercepted a formation of about 35 Japanese bombers with an escort of about 20 Zeros. The Brewster pilots destroyed 11 Japanese aircraft and lost four Brewsters; two Dutch pilots died.

Only four airworthy Buffalos remained on 7 March. Capt. Jacob van Helsdingen led this flight on its final sortie that day, and was credited with a Zero before he was killed. This made him and Lt. August Deibel the most successful Dutch pilots on the Buffalo with three victories each. Altogether, 17 ML-KNIL pilots were killed, and 30 aircraft shot down; 15 were destroyed on the ground, and several were lost to misadventure. Dutch pilots claimed 55 enemy aircraft destroyed.

USAAF/RAAF in Australia
Following the surrender of the Netherlands East Indies on 8 March 1942, 17 B339-23 belonging to the ML-KNIL (diverted to Australia because of late delivery) were transferred to the U.S. Fifth Air Force in Australia.
All of these USAAF aircraft were lent to the RAAF, with which they were used mainly for air defence duties outside frontline areas, photo-reconnaissance and gunnery training. Buffalos served with 1 PRU, 24 Sqn, 25 Sqn, 85 Sqn and the RAAF Gunnery Training School.

Between August 1942 and November 1943, 10 of these Brewsters constituted the air defense force for Perth, Western Australia, while assigned to 25 and 85 Sqns at RAAF Pearce and RAAF Guildford.
In 1944, all of the surviving aircraft were transferred to the USAAF.

U.S. Marine Corps

At Midway Island, United States Marine Corps fighter squadron VMF-221 operated a mixed group of 20 Brewster F2A-3 Buffalos and seven Grumman F4F-3 Wildcats. Wake Island fell on the following day. The squadron first saw action on 10 March 1942 when a Kawanishi H8K "Emily" flying boat was shot down by Captain James L. Neefus near Midway, the Buffalo's first kill in U.S. service.

During the Battle of Midway in 1942, VMF-221 was destined to participate in one of the few aerial combats involving the Buffalo in U.S. military service. The initial Buffalo interception of the first Japanese air raid was led by Major Floyd B. Parks, whose 13-aircraft division did not fly in paired flights of mutually supporting aircraft. After attacking a formation of 30–40 Aichi D3A1 "Val" dive bombers escorted by 36 Zeros, the Marines, flying in two divisions of aircraft, downed several Japanese bombers before the escorting Zeros reacted; a furious dogfight developed. Thirteen out of 20 Buffalos were lost; of the six Wildcats, only two remained flyable at the end of the mission. The losses included the Marine air commander, Major Parks, who bailed out of his burning Buffalo, only to be strafed by Zeros after parachuting into the sea.

The Marine pilots who managed to shake off the Zeros used high speed split-s turns or very steep dives. These maneuvers were later found to be the best means to evade pursuit by the highly maneuverable Japanese fighters. One F2A-3 pilot, Marine Captain William Humberd, dove away from his pursuers, then attacked a Zero in a head-on pass, shooting his opponent down. In the battle, some F2A-3s suffered from inoperative guns. The nose-mounted guns' occasional failure to fire was noticed by other users as well; the phenomenon may have been caused by frayed electrical wires in the mechanism that synchronized the nose guns with the propeller. Other Buffalos had not been fitted with plate armor behind the pilot, making them vulnerable to even a single bullet or shell. Losses were aggravated due to the Japanese practice of strafing pilots who had bailed out. Second Lt. Charles S. Hughes, whose Buffalo was forced to retire at the start of the raid due to engine trouble, had a ringside view of the aerial combat:

The Zeros came in strafing immediately afterward. I saw two Brewsters trying to fight the Zeros. One was shot down and the other was saved by ground fires covering his tail. Both looked like they were tied to a string while the Zeros made passes at them.

Second Lt. Charles M. Kunz reported that after successfully downing two Val bombers, he was attacked by Japanese fighters:
I was at an altitude of about 9,000 ft, and shoved over in a dive trying to shake the plane on my tail until I was about 20 feet from the water. I was making radical turns hoping the pilot couldn't get steadied on me. I glanced out of the rear and saw that it was a Zero fighter. I continued flying on a rapid turning course at full throttle when I was hit in the head by a glancing bullet. After he fired a few short bursts he left as I had been in a general direction of 205 degrees heading away from the island. My plane was badly shot up... In my opinion, the Zero fighter has been far underestimated. I think it is probably one of the finest fighters in the present war. As for the F2A-3, (or Brewster trainer), it should be in Miami as a training plane, rather than used as a first-line fighter.

Claire Chennault's report on the Zero and air combat reached Washington in 1941, where it was disseminated to aviation forces of the U.S. Army and Navy. This information, along with the development of two-plane mutual defensive formations and tactics, were incorporated into U.S. and Marine Corps air combat training doctrine by some prescient U.S. commanders, including Lieutenant Commander "Jimmy" Thach. The Thach Weave was developed for use by Wildcat pilots against the Zero and was later adopted by other Wildcat squadrons in the Pacific.

With the emergence of new tactics for the F4F-3 and F4F-4 Wildcat, the Battle of Midway marked the end of the Buffalo in both U.S. Navy and Marine Corps fighting squadrons. Surviving F2A-3 aircraft were transported to the U.S. mainland, where they were used as advanced trainers. The introduction in late 1943 of vastly superior American carrier-borne fighters such as the F6F Hellcat and Vought F4U Corsair soon relegated the Brewster F2A-3 to a distant memory.

Buffalo aces
The Finnish Air Force produced 36 Buffalo aces. The top three were Capt. Hans Wind, with 39 Buffalo air victories (out of 75), WO Eino Ilmari Juutilainen, with 34 (out of 94) and Capt. Jorma Karhunen, with 25.5 (out of 31.5). First Lt Lauri Nissinen also had victories in the type (22.5 out of 32.5).

The non-Finnish Buffalo aces were: Geoff Fisken  (RNZAF), with six air victories, and Doug Vanderfield (RAAF) with five individual kills, plus one shared. Alf Clare (RAAF) and Maurice Holder (RAF) had five victories each.

Variants

XF2A-1 Prototype
F2A-1 (with Wright R-1820-34 Cyclone engine and two guns above engine cowling, plus two optional guns in the wings) for the United States Navy, 11 built
F2A-2 (with Wright R-1820-40 Cyclone engine and four guns) for the United States Navy and Marines, 43 built
F2A-3 Improved F2A-2 for the United States Navy with larger fuel tank, heavier armour, and provision to carry two underwing  bombs, 108 built
XF2A-4 One converted from an F2A-3
B-239 Export version of the F2A-1 for Finland (with Wright R-1820-G5 Cyclone engines and four guns), 44 built
B-339B Export version for Belgium, 40 built (only two delivered to Belgium, the rest to the Royal Navy's Fleet Air Arm)
B-339C Export version for the Netherlands East Indies with Wright GR-1820-G105 Cyclone engines; 24 built
B-339D Export version for the Netherlands East Indies with  Wright R-1820-40 Cyclone engines; 48 built (47 delivered to Dutch East Indies)
B-339E Export version of the F2A-2 for the Royal Air Force with Wright GR-1820-G105 Cyclone engines as the Buffalo Mk I; 170 built (also used by the RAAF and RNZAF)
B-339-23 a.k.a. B-439 Export version of the F2A-3 for the Netherlands East Indies with  Wright GR-1820-G205A engines; 20 built (17 later to the RAAF, some used by the USAAF)

Operators

 Royal Australian Air Force
No. 21 Squadron RAAF
No. 24 Squadron RAAF
No. 25 Squadron RAAF (ex-Dutch)
No. 43 Squadron RAAF
No. 85 Squadron RAAF (ex-25 Sqn.)
No. 453 Squadron RAAF
No. 452 Squadron RAAF
No. 1 PRU RAAF (ex-Dutch, Photo Reconnaissance Unit)

 Finnish Air Force
No. 24 Squadron (1941–1944)
No. 26 Squadron (1944–1945)

 Captured Buffalos were repaired and test flown, both in Japanese markings, and – starring in recreated combat footage – in incorrect RAF markings.

 Militaire Luchtvaart KNIL
Vliegtuiggroep IV, 3e Afdeling (3-VLG-IV: 3rd Squadron, IV Group)
Vliegtuiggroep V, 1e Afdeling (1-VLG-V)
Vliegtuiggroep V, 2e Afdeling (2-VLG-V, helped defend Singapore)
Vliegtuiggroep V, 3e Afdeling (3-VLG-V)

 Royal New Zealand Air Force
No. 488 Squadron RNZAF

 Royal Air Force
No. 60 Squadron RAF
No. 67 Squadron RAF (ex-60 Sqn., most pilots were RNZAF)
No. 71 Squadron RAF
No. 146 Squadron RAF (ex-67 Sqn.)
No. 243 Squadron RAF (most pilots were RNZAF)
Royal Navy Fleet Air Arm
711 Naval Air Squadron
759 Naval Air Squadron
760 Naval Air Squadron
804 Naval Air Squadron
805 Naval Air Squadron
813 Naval Air Squadron
885 Naval Air Squadron

 United States Army Air Forces
5th Air Force, Australia (ex-Dutch)
United States Marine Corps
VMF-111, based at Camp Kearney, Calif.
VMF-112, based at Camp Kearney, Calif.
VMD-2
VMF-211, based at Palmyra Atoll
VMF-212, based at MCAS Ewa
VMF-213, based at MCAS Ewa
VMF-214, based at MCAS Ewa
VMF-221, used in Battle of Midway
VMF-222, based at MCAS Ewa
VMF-224
VMO-251
United States Navy
VF-2
VF-3
VF-9
VJ-5
VJ-6
VS-201
Training Units at NAS Pensacola and NAS Miami

Surviving aircraft and replicas

Only export models of the Buffalo are preserved. There is currently a complete Finnish B-239 (BW-372), a VL Humu variant (HM-671 at the Central Finland Aviation museum), and two replicas – one in ML-KNIL markings and the other in U.S. Navy markings.

Finnish B-239 (serial no. The Finnish museum also has components from FAF BW-393. 

In June 2012, divers discovered the partial wreckage of a Buffalo in shallow water just off Midway Atoll. The aircraft had been ditched during February 1942, after an aborted landing attempt in bad weather by 1st Lt Charles W. Somers Jr., USMC (later Colonel, USMC Ret). Officials at the Papahanaumokuakea Marine National Monument, where the wreckage was found, have not decided whether to recover any of the parts or leave them in place.

In July 2008, a static full-scale replica B-339C was completed by the Cradle of Aviation Museum in Long Island, New York. The aircraft carries the markings of an ML-KNIL fighter flown by Lt. Gerard Bruggink (two kills). It was built for the Militaire-Luchtvaartmuseum (Military Aviation Museum) at Soesterberg, the Netherlands. The Cradle of Aviation Museum houses a static full-scale replica/model F2A-2, carrying the markings of unit "201-S-13" from VS-201, aboard USS Long Island.

Specifications (F2A-3)

See also

References

Notes

Citations

Bibliography
 Arena, Nino. I caccia a motore radiale Fiat G.50 (in Italian). Modena: Mucchi editore, 1996. NO ISBN
 Boer, P.C. The Loss of Java. Singapore: NUS Press, 2011. .
 Boer, P.C. Het Verlies van Java (in Dutch). Amsterdam: De Bataafsche Leeuw, 2006. .
 Byk, Gary. Buffalo Down Under: The Modeller's Guide to Australia's Inherited Fighter. Glen Waverly, Victoria, Australia: Red Roo Models Publication, 1998.
 Cull, Brian, Paul Sortenhaug and Mark Haselden. Buffaloes over Singapore: RAF, RAAF, RNZAF and Dutch Brewster Fighters in Action over Malaya and the East Indies 1941–1942. London: Grub Street, 2003. .
 Dann, Richard S/Ginter, Steve. Brewster F2A Buffalo and Export Variants. Simi Valley, CA: Ginter Publications, 2017. .
 Dennis, Peter et al. The Oxford Companion to Australian Military History. Melbourne: Oxford University Press Australia & New Zealand, 2008 (Second edition). .
 Drendel, Lou. U.S. Navy Carrier Fighters of World War II. Carrollton, Texas: Squadron/Signal Publications Inc., 1987. 
 Ford, Daniel. "The Sorry Saga of the Brewster Buffalo". Air&Space/Smithsonian, July 1996. Expanded and revised digital edition, Warbird Books, 2013.
Gerdessen, F. "Talkback". Air Enthusiast. No. 13, August–November 1980. p. 78. 
 Green, William and Gordon Swanborough. "Brewster F2A Buffalo". WW2 Fact Files: US Navy and Marine Corps Fighters. London: Macdonald and Jane's, 1976, pp. 5–15. .
 Green, William and Gordon Swanborough. "Brewster's Benighted Buffalo". Air Enthusiast Quarterly, No. 1, n.d., pp. 66–83.  
 Horn, Steve. "The Second Attack on Pearl Harbor: Operation K And Other Japanese Attempts to Bomb America in World War II". Annapolis, Maryland: Naval Institute Press, 2005. .
 Huggins, Mark. "Falcons on Every Front: Nakajima's KI-43-I Hayabusa in Combat." Air Enthusiast, Issue 131, September/October 2007.
 Keskinen, Kalevi, Kari Stenman and Klaus Niska. Brewster B-239 ja Humu (in Finnish). Espoo, Finland: Tietoteos, 1977. . Expanded and revised edition published in two parts:
 Brewster Model 239: Suomen Ilmavoimien Historia 1A. Espoo, Finland: Kari Stenman Publishing, 2005. .
 Brewster Model 239: Suomen Ilmavoimien Historia 1B. Espoo, Finland: Kari Stenman Publishing, 2005. .
 Lamp, C. O. The Flying Tigers Poke Payoff: They Saved China. iUniverse, 2007. .

 Lundstrom, John B. The First Team: Pacific Naval Air Combat from Pearl Harbor to Midway. Annapolis, Maryland: Naval Institute Press, 2005. .
 Maas, Jim. F2A Buffalo in action. Carrollton, Texas: Squadron/Signal Publications Inc., 1988. .
 Moran, Jim. Wake Island 1941: A Battle to Make the Gods Weep (Osprey Campaign 144). Botley, Oxford, UK: Osprey Publishing, 2011. .

 Neulen, Hans Werner. In the Skies of Europe. Ramsbury, Marlborough, UK: The Crowood Press, 2000. .
 O'Leary, Michael. United States Naval Fighters of World War II in Action. Poole, Dorset, UK: Blandford Press, 1980. .
 Pacco, John. "Brewster B-339" Belgisch Leger/Armee Belge: Het militair Vliegwezen/l'Aeronautique militaire 1930–1940 (in French). Artselaar, Belgium: J.P. Publications, 2003, pp. 70–71. .
 Raunio, Jukka. Lentäjän näkökulma 2 – Pilot's viewpoint 2 (in Finnish). Self-published, 1993. .
 Shores, Christopher. The Brewster Buffalo (Aircraft in Profile 217). Windsor, Berkshire, UK: Profile Publications Ltd., 1971.
 Stanaway, John. Nakajima Ki.43 "Hayabusa": Allied Code Name "Oscar". Bennington, Vermont: Merriam Press, 1998. .
 Stenman, Kari and Andrew Thomas. Brewster F2A Buffalo Aces of World War 2 (Aircraft of the Aces). Botley, Oxford, UK: Osprey Publishing, 2010. .
 Stenman, Kari and Kalevi Keskinen. Finnish Aces of World War 2. Botley, Oxford, UK: Osprey Publishing, 1998. .
 Stenman, Kari. Lentolaivue 24. Botley, Oxford, UK: Osprey Publishing, 2001. .
 Swanborough, Gordon and Peter M. Bowers. United States Navy Aircraft since 1911. London: Putnam, Second Edition, 1976. .
 Taylor, John W.R. "Brewster F2A Buffalo." Combat Aircraft of the World from 1909 to the present. New York: G.P. Putnam's Sons, 1969. .
 Wheeler, Barry C. The Hamlyn Guide to Military Aircraft Markings. London: Chancellor Press, 1992. .
 Winchester, Jim. "Brewster Buffalo." The World's Worst Aircraft: From Pioneering Failures to Multimillion Dollar Disasters. London: Amber Books Ltd., 2005. .
 Wixey, Ken. A Rotund New Yorker: Brewster's Embattled Buffalo. Air Enthusiast 105, May/June 2003, pp. 26–40. 
 Zbiegniewski, Andre R. Brewster F2A Buffalo (bilingual Polish/English). Lublin, Poland: Kagero, 2003. .

External links

 Manual: (1939) AP 1806A – Pilot's Notes – The Buffalo I Aeroplane – Wright Cyclone GR. 1820 G. 105A Engine
 Squadron Leader W.J. Harper, 1946, "Report on NO. 21 and NO. 453 RAAF squadrons" (transcribed by Dan Ford for Warbird's Forum.)
 Brewster F2A-3 Buffalo
 Finnish Buffalo BW372 recovery

F02A
1930s United States fighter aircraft
Single-engined tractor aircraft
Carrier-based aircraft
Low-wing aircraft
Aircraft first flown in 1937
World War II aircraft of Finland